Beerenberg (Dutch: "Bear mountain") may refer to

Beerenberg, a stratovolcano on Jan Mayen, Norway
Beerenberg (Sauerland), a mountain in Sauerland, Germany
Beerenberg (Winterthur), a hill in Winterthur, Switzerland
Beerenberg Abbey, an abbey in Winterthur, Switzerland
Beerenberg Corp (Norwegian company), formerly Dalseide & Fløysand, a Norwegian technical service company
Beerenberg Farm, an Australian producer of jams, condiments, sauces and dressings

See also
Berenberg (disambiguation)
Berenberg Bank, a German bank